Sorokin, or Sorokina (feminine; Соро́кина), is a common Russian surname, derived from the Russian word soroka (сорока, or magpie). Those bearing it include the following:

 Aleksei Sorokin, Estonian politician
 Alexey Sorokin (fashion designer), fashion designer
 Alexey Sorokin (military commander), Admiral and Hero of the Soviet Union
 Anastasia Sorokina, Belarusian/Australian chess Woman International Master 
 Anna Sorokin, Russian fraud perpetrator
 Coti Sorokin, Argentine singer-songwriter
 Evgraf Sorokin, painter
 Ilya Sorokin, NHL goalie under contract with the New York Islanders
 Irina Sorokina, Russian-Norwegian laser physicist
 Ivan Sorokin, Russian commander during the Russian Civil War
 Maxim Sorokin, Russian chess player (grandmaster)
 Natalie Sorokin, French woman known for her affairs with Simone de Beauvoir and Jean-Paul Sartre
 Nikolai Sorokin, Russian theatre and film actor, theatre director, educator, People's Artist of Russia
 Pavel Sorokin (painter), painter
 Peter P. Sorokin, an American physicist, co-inventor of the dye laser
 Pitirim Sorokin, Russian-American sociologist
 Pyotr Sorokin, a Russian international soccer player
 Stanislav Sorokin (boxer), a Soviet boxer
 Stanislav Sorokin (footballer), Ukrainian football player
 Vasili Sorokin, mosaic artist
 Vitali Sorokin, swimmer
 Vladimir Sorokin, writer
 Zakhar Sorokin, Soviet military officer and declared Hero of the Soviet Union

See also 
 Sorkin, surname
 Sorok
 Soroki
 Sorokina, genus of fungi

Russian-language surnames
Jewish surnames